ActiveReports is a .NET reporting tool used by developers of .NET (cross-platform, WinForms), and ASP.NET/JavaScript (WebForms, MVC 5, Core, Blazor) applications. It was originally developed by Data Dynamics, which was then acquired by GrapeCity. It is written in managed C# code and allows Visual Studio programmers to leverage their knowledge of C# or Visual Basic.NET when programming with ActiveReports.

ActiveReports allows to developers to create win/web applications, which allow to end-users to create and/or preview complicated reports. Among the components included with ActiveReports are exports to file formats such as PDF, Excel, RTF, and Word and other. ActiveReports also includes Visual Studio integrated report designer, and an API that developers use to create customized reports from a variety of data sources.

ActiveReports allows to create and work with next types of reports:

 Section Reports with banded sections like the original ActiveReports (reminiscent of Microsoft Access reports). Really it is set of 2 similar formats (with some differences, like differences in scripts): XML-based (can be created by end-users) and CodeDOM-based (required Visual Studio).
 Report Definition Language based report types:
 RDL Reports with a continuous page layout like the original Data Dynamics Reports. Similar to reports from SQL Server Reporting Services.
 RDL Multi-Section Reports - extension of RDL Reports with different page sizes.
 RDL Dashboard Reports - web-first extension of RDL Reports to develop reports, which can be used as Dashboard.
 Page Reports with a fixed layout for pages. Created to reproduce legacy paper forms logic.

ActiveReports has 2 editions: Standard and Professional (with some features unlocked).

History of version

ActiveReport 1/ActiveReports 2
Old Visual Basic COM components.

ActiveReport for .NET 1/ActiveReports for .NET 2
Same components, but for .NET.

ActiveReport for .NET 3
 Design-time preview tab.
 Component tray for design-time work with .NET data providers.
 Report Explorer support for parameters and calculated fields.
 Design-time support for custom parameters and unbound fields.
 New chart types: Funnel, Pyramid, Gantt, Kagi, Point and figure, Renko, Three line break.
 ReportInfo control for page N of M or report run dates.

ActiveReport 6
 Microsoft Silverlight support.
 Windows Azure reporting in partial trust and full trust modes.
 ASP.NET medium trust support.
 Support for .NET Framework 4.0 Client profile.
 Support of conversion from Crystal Reports.
 New report items (cross-section box, line, new Reduced Space Symbology (RSS) barcode styles).
 External style sheets.
 Designer snap lines.
 Granular control over text boxes and labels.
 64 bit support.

ActiveReport 7
 Added Page/RDL Reports from discarded product Data Dynamics Reports.
 Advanced printing support.
 New license.
 Added a WPF Report Viewer.
 Added a PDF/A export option for report archiving.

ActiveReport 8
 Added touch support for the Windows and WPF Viewer. 
 Added the Map report item.
 Added the HTML5 viewer (JS component, which can work with the same server as WebForms viewer).
 New barcode styles.
 Added ActiveReports Server as an optional add-on that supports multi-tenant reporting.

ActiveReport 9
 Added layers to Page/RDL Reports.
 Added the Visual Query Designer, a graphical interface that allows users to interactively build queries and view the results.
 Added the Table of Contents control to Page/RDL Reports.
 New Excel export for Page/RDL Reports.

ActiveReport 10
 Replaced the Matrix report item with the new Tablix (for Page/RDL Reports).
 New DOCX exports for Page/RDL Reports.
 Added style sheets for RDL and Page reports.
 Improved integration between ActiveReports Server and the developer version of ActiveReports.

ActiveReports 11
 Optimized rendering for two times faster first page load times, 1.5 times faster PDF export file generation and 60% smaller peak memory footprint.
 Added composite charts to Page/RDL Reports.
 Added JSON data provider support.
 Added CSV data provider support.
 Improved the XML data provider with an XML Query Designer with a tree view of the data.
 Added an Excel import wizard.
 Added PDF printing pre-sets.

ActiveReports 12
 Added dataset joins to Page/RDL Reports.
 Export your Page/RDL Reports to CSV and JSON file formats.
 Added possibility to migrate from Section Reports (XML-based) to RDL Reports.

ActiveReports 13
Dropped a lot of features, like: Silverlight, Flash, medium trust and other. Discarded ActiveReports Server.
 New generation JavaScript viewer component (instead of HTML5 viewer).
 New Web Designer JavaScript component.
 New Chart control for Page/RDL reports.
 Supports for more HTML tags and attributes.
 Extending your Visual Studio theme to the ActiveReports VS integrated Designer

ActiveReports 14 
 .NET Core 3.1 support.
 Create interactive PDFs (Acrobat Forms) using the new InputField control.
 Different web-designer enhancement.
 New ASP.NET WebForms control was added.
 ActiveReports assemblies have been published to NuGet.
 ActiveReports JS packages have been published to npm.
 ActiveReports samples are now published to GitHub.

ActiveReports 15
 .NET 5 support.
 New CrossPlatform compatibility mode for Section Reports.
 Linux support for Page/RDL Reports.
 Possibility to use custom fonts for Page/RDL Reports and Section Reports (for CrossPlatform compatibility mode).
 New text print and Excel data exports for Page/RDL Reports.

ActiveReports 16
 .NET 6 support.
 SVG images support for Page/RDL Reports.
 Blazor viewer component.
 New SSRS import.
 New RDL Milti-Section Reports type.

ActiveReports 17
 Dropping of libgdiplis dependency for Section Reports.
 .NET 7 support.
 Blazor designer component.
 Different charts improvements (legend interactivity, Range and Gauge chart types).
 New RDL Dashboard Reports type.

References

External links
 
 Microsoft Solution Brief on ActiveReports Suite
 Microsoft Case Study on ActiveReports Suite
 ActiveReports Bestselling Product Awards at ComponentSource
 EggheadCafe for .NET developers on ActiveReports
 Crystal Reports vs ActiveReports
 Business Wire:GrapeCity ActiveReports 6 Adds Support for Silverlight Reporting and Enhances Windows Azure Reporting
 Business Wire:GrapeCity Announces New Upgrade-To-Suite Options for ActiveReports Customers; New Hot Fix for ActiveReports 6
 Business Wire:GrapeCity Releases ActiveReports 6, Latest Version of the Premier .NET Framework Reporting Tool for Microsoft Visual Studio
 Business Wire Press Release:GrapeCity-Data Dynamics Announces New ActiveReports/BI Suite for .NET
 Business Wire Press Release:GrapeCity acquires Data Dynamics

Business intelligence software
Reporting software
Programming tools